Sinularia flexibilis is a species of soft coral in the family Alcyoniidae. It is known commonly as the spaghetti finger leather coral. This species is widespread throughout the western Pacific and eastern Indian Oceans. It is usually found in large colonies  at depths between one and fifteen meters.

References

Further reading
Oxygenated Cembranoids from the Soft Coral Sinularia flexibilis. ncbi.nlm.nih.gov

Alcyoniidae
Corals described in 1833